Play Girl is a 1941 romantic comedy film, starring Kay Francis as an aging gold digger who decides to pass on her skills to a young protégée, and featuring James Ellison, Mildred Coles, Nigel Bruce, Margaret Hamilton and Katherine Alexander.

Plot 
Grace Herbert (Kay Francis) is a 30-something woman who has made her living from seducing wealthy men and suing them for breach of promise. At the end of her finances, she and her maid, Josie (Margaret Hamilton) head to Miami where Grace hopes to find another rich man. When that plan falls through, she stumbles upon Ellen Daley (Mildred Coles), a young lady who is looking for a job as a secretary. Instead, Grace decide to make the girl her protege and teach her how to make money leading older wealthier men on for money.

They leave for Chicago, and on the way meet Tom Dice (James Ellison) when he fixes their flat tire. All they know is that he's a cowboy, and while Ellen is attracted to him, Grace dismisses him. Grace introduces Ellen to Bill Vincent (Nigel Bruce), a vain man who likes young women, and who coaches Ellen on exactly how to lead a man on enough to get expensive presents from him, including a fat settlement to avoid a lawsuit. Despite some initial misgivings, Ellen begins to enjoy her role.

After they are finished with Vincent in Chicago, the ladies move on to New York City and Van Payson (G. P. Huntley), another older wealthy man who is happy to squire a much younger woman. While out on a date, Ellen runs into Tom and the two of them end up sharing a cab when she gets separated. He makes arrangements to call on her, but Grace, who still thinks that Tom is "just a cowboy" criticizes Ellen for wanting to see him. After doing some research however, Grace finds out that Tom is a multi-millionaire and changes her mind. She encourages Ellen to marry him because he is so wealthy.

While Ellen is very much in love with Tom, she refuses to consider marrying him because of how she has been earning her gifts. When Tom proposes, she tells him that she needs to think about it for a day. That night she leaves a note for Grace and runs away. Grace decides that since Ellen is gone, she's going to try to run her old game on Tom.

In a men's club steam room, Van overhears Bill talking about his experience with Ellen, and the two of them realize that they were dealing with the same woman. When the two of them show up at her hotel and accuse her of running a scam, she turns the tables on them, accusing Bill and Van of defaming Ellen's character and finagling them into paying her outstanding bills. She then sends them on their way. As they leave, they justify their behavior to each other, reassuring themselves that they have not been taken for another ride.

In the meantime, Grace resumes her seduction of Tom and manipulates him into proposing to her. The next morning, Tom's mother (Katharine Alexander) pays her a visit, only instead of threatening to block the marriage, she just lets Grace know that she knows all about Grace's past, but will bless their marriage as long as she promises to always love and care for him. This moves something in Grace, and when Tom comes to visit, she tells him that she knows he still loves Ellen and he should go to Miami and marry her. He rushes out to get on a plane to find her.

Tom's mother tells Grace that Tom's uncle – who is also a wealthy cattleman – is in town alone, and tells her that he is a man who needs to settle down and marry a woman who can bring some femininity to his bachelor's life. When Tom's mother tells Grace that he's in the lobby of the building, Grace tells Josie her maid to have him sent up while she gets ready to meet him. As Josie helps her dress, Grace puts on the perfume she uses when she's seducing a man and says to Josie, "For the last time".

Cast

 Kay Francis as Grace Herbert
 James Ellison as Thomas Elwood Dice
 Mildred Coles as Ellen Daley, Grace's protégée
 Nigel Bruce as William McDonald Vincent, one of Grace's former conquests
 Margaret Hamilton as Josie, Grace's maid and confidante
 Katharine Alexander as Mrs. Dice

 G. P. Huntley as Van Payson
 Kane Richmond as Don Shawhan
 Stanley Andrews as Joseph Shawhan
 Selmer Jackson as Fred Dice
 Marek Windheim as Dr. Alonso Corivini

Production
Play Girl began with the working title of "Debutantes, Inc.". Both Sheila Ryan and Elyse Knox were considered for the role of "Ellen Daly", but RKO eventually got Mildred Coles, a former beauty queen, from Warner Bros. to play the part.

References

External links
 
 
 
 

1941 romantic comedy films
1941 films
American black-and-white films
1954 films
RKO Pictures films
Films produced by Cliff Reid
American romantic comedy films
1941 comedy films
Films scored by Paul Sawtell
1950s English-language films
1940s English-language films
Films directed by Frank Woodruff
1940s American films
1950s American films